Autumn Leaves (subtitled Live at Sweet Basil) is a live album by Nat Adderley's Quintet recorded at the Sweet Basil Jazz Club in 1989 and original released on the Sweet Basil label before being rereleased in the US on the Evidence label.

Reception

The Penguin Guide to Jazz states the set "'has a leftovers feel". In his review for AllMusic, Scott Yanow stated "Cornetist Nat Adderley is in excellent form on his live sextet set but he is somewhat overshadowed by his two altoists ... The long solos are consistently inventive and colorful, making this an easily recommended Nat Adderley CD".

Track listing 
 " Big P." (Jimmy Heath) – 12:51
 "Autumn Leaves" (Joseph Kosma, Johnny Mercer, Jacques Prévert) – 20:24
 "Yesterdays" (Jerome Kern, Otto Harbach) – 15:01
 "For Duke and Cannon" (Sonny Fortune) – 9:47

Personnel 
Nat Adderley – cornet
Sonny Fortune, Vincent Herring – alto saxophone
Rob Bargad – piano
Walter Booker – bass
Jimmy Cobb – drums

References 

1991 live albums
Nat Adderley live albums
Evidence Music live albums